Veronika Erjavec (born 30 December 1999) is a Slovenian tennis player.

She has a career-high singles ranking of world No. 382, achieved on 19 September 2022. On 1 August 2022, she peaked at No. 240 in the WTA doubles rankings. Erjavec has won 13 doubles titles on the ITF Women's Circuit.

Career

2018
She won the bronze medal for  Slovenia at the Mediterranean Games held in Tarragona, Spain, in June 2018. Erjavec beat Italian Lucia Bronzetti in bronze medal match. In July, she won the doubles tournament in Prokuplje, Serbia, with her Croatian partner Lea Bošković. In September, she played in the doubles final of the Royal Cup in Podgorica, Montenegro. At the end of the year, she played in doubles finals of the ITF tournaments in Italy.

2019
Erjavec started season with the tournament held in Tabarka, Tunisia. She became champion in doubles with her Bosnian partner, Nefisa Berberović. In May, Erjavec played her first singles final in Croatia at Tučepi. She lost to Czech Johana Marková in the final, but won her second title of the season with Berberović in the doubles final. In June, she reached the third doubles championship of the season alongside Berberović in Bosnia and Herzegovina.

2022
In May 2022, she won a tournament in Split, Croatia, with her partner Lea Bošković. The duo also won a $25k tournament in Austria. Erjavec then entered the final of the tournament held in Brasov, Romania in June. She won another championship with her Croatian partner Bošković at Tarviso, Italy in July.

ITF finals

Singles: 3 (3 runner–ups)

Doubles: 23 (13 titles, 10 runner–ups)

National representation

Multi-sports event
Erjavec made her debut representing Slovenia in multi-sports event at the 2018 Mediterranean Games, she won the women's singles bronze medal.

Singles: 1 (bronze medal)

References

External links
 
 

1999 births
Living people
Slovenian female tennis players
Competitors at the 2018 Mediterranean Games
Mediterranean Games bronze medalists for Slovenia
Mediterranean Games medalists in tennis